National Investment Bank, normally abbreviated to NIB, is a state owned commercial bank in Ghana. It is one of the commercial banks licensed by the Bank of Ghana, the national banking regulator.

NIB is a medium-sized financial services provider in Ghana. , the total valuation of the bank's assets was approximately US$468.5 million (GHS:878.9 million), with shareholders' equity of approximately US$47 million (GHS:88.1 million).

History
The bank was established by the Government of Ghana in 1963, as a national development bank. Later, the bank was granted a commercial banking license by the Bank of Ghana, the national banking regulator.

Branch network
, the bank maintains a network of 52 branches

See also
List of banks in Ghana
Economy of Ghana

References

Banks of Ghana
Companies based in Accra
Banks established in 1963
1963 establishments in Ghana